"Paraocchi" is a song by Italian singer Blanco. It was released as a single on 25 February 2021 by Island Records and included in Blanco's debut album Blu celeste. It was written by Blanco, Michelangelo and Davide "d.whale" Simonetta, and produced by Michelangelo and Simonetta.

The song peaked at number 3 on the FIMI single chart and was certified triple platinum in Italy.

Music video
The music video for "Paraocchi", directed by Simone Peluso and filmed in Hungary, was released on 26 February 2021 via Blanco's YouTube channel. , the video has over 20 million views on YouTube.

Personnel
Credits adapted from Tidal.
 Blanco – associated performer, lyricist, vocals
 Michelangelo – producer and composer
 Davide Simonetta – producer and composer

Charts

Weekly charts

Year-end charts

Certifications

References

2021 singles
2021 songs
Island Records singles
Blanco (singer) songs
Songs written by Blanco (singer)